The Rime of the Ancient Mariner is a poem by Samuel Taylor Coleridge.

Rime of the Ancient Mariner may also refer to:

The Rime of the Ancient Mariner (film), a 1975 British film
Rime of the Ancient Mariner (film), a 1978 British television film
"Rime of the Ancient Mariner" (song), a song by Iron Maiden from the album Powerslave

See also
Ancient Mariner (disambiguation)